Edmundo Ros OBE, FRAM (7 December 1910 – 21 October 2011), born Edmund William Ross, was a Trinidadian-Venezuelan musician, vocalist, arranger and bandleader who made his career in Britain. He directed a highly popular Latin American orchestra, had an extensive recording career and owned one of London's leading nightclubs.

Early life
Edmund William Ross was born in Port of Spain, Trinidad. His mother, Luisa Urquart, was a Venezuelan teacher, thought to be descended from indigenous Caribs, and his father, William Hope-Ross, was a mulatto of Scottish descent. He was the eldest of four children, having two sisters, Ruby and Eleanor, followed by a half-brother, Hugo. His parents separated after Hugo was born, and after various false steps Edmund was enrolled in a military academy. There he became interested in music and learned to play the euphonium and percussion. When his mother became involved with a man he loathed and had a son by him, the 17-year-old left for Caracas, Venezuela, to study at the Academy of Music under Vicente Emilio Sojo.
 
He played drums in the city's nightclubs and in the Martial Band of Caracas, and he was soon hired by Sojo as timpanist in the new Venezuela Symphony Orchestra. As his obituary in The Guardian noted: "His local name, 'Edmundo Ros', launched a lasting myth that he was Venezuelan." Later he received a music scholarship from the Venezuelan government of Eleazar Lopez Contreras, and, from 1937 to 1942, studied harmony, composition and orchestration at the Royal Academy of Music. At the same time he was the vocalist and percussionist in Don Marino Barreto's band at the Embassy Club, and also recorded several sides as a sideman to Fats Waller, who was visiting London in 1938.

Orchestra 
In August 1940, Ros formed his own orchestra, performing as Edmundo Ros and His Rumba Band in the style of Lecuona Cuban Boys directed by Armando Oréfiche. In 1941 he cut his first tracks with Parlophone, the first number being "Los Hijos de Buda". The band played regularly at the Coconut Grove club in Regent Street, attracting members of London's high society and royal family.

Ros's bands were always based in London nightclubs or restaurants. The first was the Cosmo Club in Wardour Street; then followed the St Regis Hotel, Cork Street, the Coconut Grove and the Bagatelle Restaurant, that opened the doors for Ros and high society. All the leaders of Allied Countries in World War II and the Royal Family came there to dine and listen to Edmundo's Rumba Band. At the Bagatelle a visit from Princess Elizabeth and party made his name. The future queen danced in public for the first time to Edmundo's music. By then, with his gently rhythmic style and engaging vocals, he was enormously popular with the public generally, and his orchestra was often invited to play at Buckingham Palace.

By 1946 Ros owned a club, a dance school, a record company and an artistes' agency. His band grew to 16 musicians and was renamed Edmundo Ros and His Orchestra. Among his percussionists was Ginger Johnson. His number "The Wedding Samba", 1949, sold three million 78s. His album Rhythms of The South (1958) was one of the first high-quality LP stereo records: it sold a million copies. He was with Decca Records from 1944 to 1974, and altogether he made more than 800 recordings.

In 1950, King George VI invited him to perform at Windsor, and he took his fiancée, the beautiful Swedish aristocrat Britt Johansen, whom he married that year.

In 1951 Ros bought the Coconut Grove on Regent Street and in 1964 renamed it Edmundo Ros's Dinner and Supper Club. The club became popular for its atmosphere and music, but it closed in 1965, when legalised casino gambling had drawn away many of its best customers. During the 1950s and 1960s the Ros orchestra appeared frequently on BBC Radio, continuing into the early 1970s on Radio Two Ballroom.

In the early 1960s, he collaborated with the Ted Heath orchestra on the album Heath versus Ros (Decca Phase 4 1964) that exploited the relatively new stereo recording process. The shift in musical tastes to rock bands such as The Beatles and The Rolling Stones affected Ros's standing but he played on into the 1970s.

In 1975, during Ros's seventh tour of Japan, his band's Musicians' Union shop steward tried to usurp Ros's authority by making arrangements with venues behind his back. Upon their return to the UK Ros organised a celebratory dinner after a BBC recording session and announced the disbanding of the orchestra. He destroyed almost all the charts (arrangement sheets), which conclusively ended the orchestra's existence.

In 1994, Edmundo conducted and sang with the BBC Big Band with Strings at the Queen Elizabeth Hall in London. The other conductor was Stanley Black. The concert was broadcast over BBC Radio 2 and it was such a success that a Japanese recording company invited them into a recording studio in London to make yet another Edmundo Ros CD.

Affiliations and honours 
Ros was initiated into the exclusive entertainment fraternity the Grand Order of Water Rats on October 4, 1964.  A year and a half later he was made a Freeman of the City of London, having been admitted to the Freedom of the Worshipful Company of Poulters on 5 January 1965 and subsequently clothed with the Livery of the Poulters' Company on 22 June 1965. He was a Freemason, initiated into the Chelsea Lodge No 3098 and a Founder Member and Worshipful Master of Lodge of Ascension No 7358; on retirement a member of Sprig of Acacia Lodge No 41, Javea, Spain.

He became a Fellow of the Royal Academy of Music in 1991. He normally was nicknamed by fans and journalists as the King of Latin Music.

In 2000, the composer Michael Nyman produced a BBC TV documentary about him entitled I Sold My Cadillac to Diana Dors, and described him as: "One of the few black men to have attained national recognition; he hadn't gone for 'the gorblimeys', he wanted to be a gentleman, the greatest satisfaction you can earn in England."

In the 2000 New Year Honours, Ros (then aged 90) was appointed by Her Majesty Queen Elizabeth II as Officer of the Order of the British Empire (OBE) in ceremony at Buckingham Palace. He turned 100 on 7 December 2010.

Personal life 
Ros married twice: first to Britt Johansen in 1950. The first marriage produced two children, Anders Douglas and Britt Luisa. He designed and built a large house in Page Street, Mill Hill, London NW7, which he named Edritt House, after himself and his first wife. The house still stands, next to Copthall Girls' School. He married his second wife, Susan, in 1971.

Death 
Ros retired and moved to Jávea, Alicante, Spain. He gave his last public performance on 8 January 1994.  He died on 21 October 2011, shortly before his 101st birthday.

Discography

78s (reissued on Harlequin CDs) 
This set of ten CDs includes all the known 78s recorded up to and including 1951; the source material was the 78rpm collection of Christian af Rosenborg; the notes were by Pepe Luhtala; the remastering by Charlie Crump. The series was never completed, but most of the later Ros material is available on LP or CD. Some of the Harlequin series is available on Naxos. Although the title of these CDs calls his group the Rumba Band, in the post-war period it expanded to 16 members, and was known as Edmundo Ros and his Orchestra.
 Edmundo Ros and his Rumba Band, 1939–41, Harlequin CD 15. Includes about 8 minutes of Edmundo Ros discussing the early days of his career.
 Tropical Magic: Edmundo Ros and his Rumba Band, vol 2, 1942–44. Harlequin CD 50. Includes four sets of Edmundo Ros continuing his autobiographic reminiscences.
 Cuban Love Song: Edmundo Ros and his Rumba Band, vol 3, 1945. Harlequin CD 73.
 Chiquita Banana: Edmundo Ros and his Rumba Band, vol 4, 1946–47. Harlequin CD 105.
 La Comparsa: Edmundo Ros and his Rumba Band, vol 5, 1948. Harlequin CD 129.
 Chocolate Whisky and Vanilla Gin: Edmundo Ros and his Rumba Band, vol 6, 1948–49. Harlequin CD 147.
 Mambo Jambo: Edmundo Ros and his Rumba Band, vols 7 & 8, 1949–50. Harlequin CD 164/165.
 Playtime in Brazil: Edmundo Ros and his Orchestra, vols 9 & 10, 1951. Harlequin CD 180/181.

10" LPs 
Decca issued an initial series of 33rpm 10-inch LPs in the early 1950s, consisting of previously issued 78rpm sides. Labels were Decca (UK and Commonwealth) and London (a subsidiary) in the US and Canada.
 Latin-American Rhythms, Edmundo Ros and his Rumba Band, Decca LF 1002. Latin Rhythms, Edmundo Ros and his Orchestra, London 155, is identical in content.
 Mambo with Ros. Decca LF 1038, and London LPB 341.
 Samba with Ros. Decca LF, and London LB 367.
 Latin-American Rhythms with Ros. Decca LP 1051, and London LPB 368.
 Ros presents Calypsos. Decca LF 1067, and London LB 367.
 Dance the Samba. Decca LF 1126, and London LB 742.

12" LPs 
Three labels, all owned by Decca: Decca in the UK and the Commonwealth as well as London and its cut-price reissue label Richmond High Fidelity in the United States and Canada.
 Latin-American Novelties (London LL 1090)
 Ros Mambos (London LL 1092, Decca 1956)
 Latin Melodies (London LL 1093)
 Ros Album of Sambas (London LL 1117), Richmond B 20032 has same content, but only 10 numbers where Decca/London has 14.
 Ros Album of Calypsos (Decca LK 4102, 1956)
 Ros Album of Baions (Decca LK 4111), one side baiãos; the other boleros.
 Mambo Party (Richmond B 20022)
 Latin Carnival (Richmond B 20023)
 Rhythms of the South (Decca 1958)
 Calypso Mania (Decca 1958)
 Perfect for Dancing (Decca 1958)
 Hi-Fiesta Perfect for Dancing (London LL3000)
 Ros on Broadway (London PS110 1957, Decca 1959)
 Hollywood Cha Cha Cha (Decca 1959)
 Dancing With Edmundo (Decca LK 4353, 1960)
 Fire & Frenzy (London sw 99019, 1960), with singing by Caterina Valente
 Bongos From the South (Decca 1961)
 Song 'N Clap Along With Edmundo Ros (London PS 226, 1961)
 Sing Along Clap Along With Ros on Broadway (Decca LK 4388, 1961)
 Dancing With Ros (London FFSS PS 205, 1961)
 Samba! (Richmond B 20032, 1962)
 Dance Again (Decca 1962)
 Sing and Dance with Edmundo Ros (Decca SKL 4526, 1963)
 Heath versus Ros (Decca Phase 4, 1964)
 Caterina Valente com Edmundo Ros (London LLN-7058, 1964)
 Latein Amerikanische Rhythmen (Decca 1964), with singing by Caterina Valente
 Sing and Dance with Edmundo Ros (Decca SKL 4885, 1967)
 Heath versus Ros, Round Two (Decca Phase 4, 1967)
 Hair Goes Latin (Decca 1969)
 Heading South of the Border (Decca Phase 4, 1970)
 This is My World (Decca 1972)
 Caribbean Ros (Decca 1974)
 Ros Remembers (Decca 1974)
 Sunshine and Olé! (London Phase 4, 1976)
 Edmundo Ros Today (Decca 1978)
 Show Boat/Porgy & Bess (LP)
 Ros at the Opera Broadway goes Latin New Rhythms of the South Latin Boss...Señor Ros Arriba Latin Hits I Missed The Latin King This is My World Give My Regards to Broadway That Latin Sound Latin Favourites (Gold Crown 1979)
 Latin Song and Dance Men (Pye 1980)
 Music For the Millions (Decca 1983)
 Strings Latino (London 1985)
 Latin Magic (London 1987)
 That Latin Sound (Pulse 1997)
 Doin' the Samba, CD
 Rhythms of the South/New Rhythms of the South, CD
 Good! Good! Good! CD
 Strings Latino/Latin Hits I Missed'' CD

References

External links 
 
 Robert Farnon Society webpage

1910 births
2011 deaths
British bandleaders
British male singers
British songwriters
Dance band bandleaders
Euphonium players
Officers of the Order of the British Empire
Freemasons of the United Grand Lodge of England
People from Port of Spain
Trinidad and Tobago centenarians
Trinidad and Tobago emigrants to the United Kingdom
20th-century Trinidad and Tobago musicians
Trinidad and Tobago people of Carib descent
Trinidad and Tobago people of British descent
Trinidad and Tobago people of Scottish descent
Parlophone artists
Decca Records artists
London Records artists
Trinidad and Tobago people of Venezuelan descent
Men centenarians
British male songwriters